Smithville is a city in Lee County, Georgia, United States. The population was 575 at the 2010 census, down from 774 at the 2000 census. It is part of the Albany, Georgia Metropolitan Statistical Area.

History
A post office was established at Smithville in 1871. The community was named after the local Smith family. The Georgia General Assembly incorporated Smithville as a town in 1863.

Geography

Smithville is located in northwestern Lee County at  (31.902073, -84.255336). It is bordered to the north by the Sumter County line.

U.S. Route 19 runs through the west side of the city, leading south  to Leesburg, the Lee county seat, and north  to Americus. Georgia State Route 118 passes through the center of Smithville, leading east  to Leslie and southwest  to Dawson.

Muckaloochee Creek forms the northeast border of the city. The creek is a south-flowing tributary of Muckalee Creek and part of the Flint River watershed.

Demographics

2020 census

As of the 2020 United States census, there were 593 people, 239 households, and 143 families residing in the city.

2000 census
As of the census of 2000, there were 774 people, 270 households, and 198 families residing in the city. The racial makeup of the city was 28.81% White, 70.28% African American, 0.39% from other races, and 0.52% from two or more races. Hispanic or Latino of any race were 1.03% of the population.

There were 270 households, out of which 40.4% had children under the age of 18 living with them, 40.7% were married couples living together, 27.8% had a female householder with no husband present, and 26.3% were non-families. 25.6% of all households were made up of individuals, and 10.4% had someone living alone who was 65 years of age or older.  The average household size was 2.87 and the average family size was 3.44.

In the city, the population was spread out, with 33.5% under the age of 18, 10.3% from 18 to 24, 26.0% from 25 to 44, 20.7% from 45 to 64, and 9.6% who were 65 years of age or older.  The median age was 30 years. For every 100 females, there were 87.0 males.  For every 100 females age 18 and over, there were 86.6 males.

The median income for a household in the city was $31,500, and the median income for a family was $37,083. Males had a median income of $29,375 versus $19,286 for females. The per capita income for the city was $12,193.  About 23.3% of families and 27.7% of the population were below the poverty line, including 34.8% of those under age 18 and 34.5% of those age 65 or over.

Education
Public schools are operated by the Lee County School District. Students are zoned to Lee County High School.

Notable people
 Bessie Jones (1902-1984), gospel and folk singer 
 Bill McAfee (1907-1958), baseball player and mayor
 William J. Sears (1874-1944), congressman from Florida
 Jeffery Waters (1989-2019), second African American to serve as Command Master Chief of Naval Air Station Jacksonville (2016-2019) 
 Ja'Lia Taylor (1989-Present) First woman to run for Mayor of Smithville. First African American to receive a PhD in Special Education from Smithville, Ga.  Founder of KimRose Brown Academy and Founder of Rare Genetics by Lia Jai']]
 Hudson Woodbridge (1904-1981), aka Tampa Red, musician in Blues Hall of Fame

Gallery

References

External links
 Smithville - State of Georgia

Cities in Georgia (U.S. state)
Cities in Lee County, Georgia
Albany metropolitan area, Georgia